Carlos Eduardo Peruena Rodríguez (13 March 1955 – 2 June 2018), known as "Toto", was a Uruguayan football defender.

Biography
He began his career in youth teams of Uruguayan club C.A. Peñarol, from which he was bought in 1978 for 15 million pesetas by Spanish outfit Real Betis. He played 83 league games for Betis, scoring 2 goals. In 1982 he joined Oviedo, making his debut for the team on 5 September 1982 against Linares in Segunda División match (3:0), scoring the second goal of the match. Later in his career he played for Granada. His last clubs were Olimpia Asunción from Paraguay and Cerrito from Uruguay. In 1988 he settled in Venezuela, living here for 3 decades and became youth coach in Club Deportivo Español de Barinas. The last years of his life he faced serious health problems, after it was being discovered that he had a tumor, and heart problems, which prevented the surgery operation.

Carlos Peruena died on 2 June, 2018 from heart failure in Barinas, Venezuela.

International career
Peruena made 4 appearances for the Uruguay national football team from 1975 to 1978, and was the participant of Copa América 1975 tournament.

References

External links 
 Official Website Of Real Betis Balompié S.A.D.
Profile At LFP.es

1955 births
2018 deaths
Uruguayan footballers
Uruguay international footballers
Peñarol players
Real Betis players
La Liga players
People from Florida Department
Association football defenders